The Czechoslovak women's handball championship was the premier championship for women's handball teams in Czechoslovakia. It was created in 1950 and dissolved in 1993.

In its early stages the championship was dominated by Czech teams, mostly Sparta Prague in the 1950s and Bohemians Prague in the 1960s. The tables were turned after Odeva Hlohovec became the first Slovak champion in 1969, with Slovak teams winning all remaining seasons except for two titles for TJ Gottwaldov in the 1970s and another one for Slavia Prague in 1991. 

The championship was highly disputed from then on, and no team won three titles in a row after Bohemians. Odeva and Plastika Nitra, which were the leading teams in the early 1970s with three and two championships respectively, were followed by Inter Bratislava with three titles in the second half of the 1970s, Štart Bratislava which also won three until 1983,  Iskra Partizánske and ZVL Prešov with four each in the 1980s, and lastly Slovan Dusľo Šaľa, which emerged in the early 1990s.

The championship was discontinued in 1993 after the Czechoslovak communist system collapsed and the country was dissolved, with the Czech Republic and Slovakia creating their own championships. In 2002 the WHIL, a supranational championship with the top Czech and Slovak teams, was created.

Champions

 1950 Sparta Prague
 1951 not disputed
 1952 not disputed
 1953 Sparta Prague
 1954 Sparta Prague
 1955 Sparta Prague
 1956 Lokomotiva Bratislava
 1957–58 Sparta Prague
 1958–59 Sparta Prague
 1959–60 Slavia Prague
 1960–61 Sparta Prague
 1961–62 Sparta Prague
 1962–63 Bohemians Prague
 1963–64 Bohemians Prague
 1964–65 Bohemians Prague

 1965–66 Bohemians Prague
 1966–67 Zora Olomouc
 1967–68 Bohemians Prague
 1968–69 Odeva Hlohovec
 1969–70 Odeva Hlohovec
 1970–71 Plastika Nitra
 1971–72 Plastika Nitra
 1972–73 Odeva Hlohovec
 1973–74 TJ Gottwaldov
 1974–75 Inter Bratislava
 1975–76 Štart Bratislava
 1976–77 TJ Gottwaldov
 1977–78 Inter Bratislava
 1978–79 Inter Bratislava
 1979–80 Iskra Partizánske

 1980–81 Iskra Partizánske
 1981–82 Štart Bratislava
 1982–83 Štart Bratislava
 1983–84 ZVL Prešov
 1984–85 Iskra Partizánske
 1985–86 ZVL Prešov
 1986–87 ZVL Prešov
 1987–88 Iskra Partizánske
 1988–89 ZVL Prešov
 1989–90 Slovan Dusľo Šaľa
 1990–91 Slavia Prague
 1991–92 Slovan Dusľo Šaľa 
 1992–93 Slovan Dusľo Šaľa

References

Wom
Defunct women's handball leagues
Handball in the Czech Republic
Women's handball in Czechoslovakia
1950 establishments in Czechoslovakia